Ejan Mackaay (born 1943) is a Canadian emeritus professor of law and author. He was a professor of law at the Université de Montréal between 1972 and 2009.

Career
Ejan Mackaay was born in Amsterdam. He obtained an LL.M from the University of Amsterdam in 1966 and an LL.M from the University of Toronto in 1977, with Michael Trebilcock as thesis adviser. He obtained his LL.D. at the University of Amsterdam in 1980 codirected by Arnold Heertje and Hans Franken on a thesis titled: "Economics of information and law". Mackaay became professor of law at the Université de Montréal in 1972. He retired in 2009.

He specialises in Economic Analysis of Law and intellectual property. Over the years, Mackaay has been involved in several organisations and institutions, including Fellow at CIRANO since 2010, director of the Centre for the Law of Business and International Trade (CDACI) (2005–2008) and director of the Public Law Research Centre (CRDP) (1999–2003), at the Université de Montréal.

In 1986, he was elected a corresponding member of the Royal Netherlands Academy of Arts and Sciences. In 1996, he was awarded the Minerva Prize of the Netherlands Society of Translators for the translation of the Netherlands Civil Code into French. In 2013, he won the Vogel Book Prize for his work Law and Economics for Civil Law Systems. On 13 November 2018, the Aix-Marseille University awarded him an honorary doctorate in law.

His research has always aimed at making the law more easily accessible, by focusing on the intersection of law and neighbouring sciences, including information technology and social sciences ("jurimetrics", Law and economics).

Publications

Books
 

 
 
 

 

 

  (member of the Organising Committee of the Conference, which took place on 1–3 October 1981)

Other publications
Several publications of Ejan Mackaay can be found on these websites:
 http://en.scientificcommons.org/ejan_mackaay
 https://depot.erudit.org/items-by-author?author=Mackaay%2C+Ejan
 https://openlibrary.org/b/OL9006747M
 https://hq.ssrn.com/submissions/MyPapers.cfm?partid=20688
 https://papyrus.bib.umontreal.ca/xmlui/discover?query=Ejan+Mackaay&submit=Aller
 https://www.researchgate.net/profile/Ejan-Mackaay/research

References

1943 births
Living people
Canadian lawyers
Dutch emigrants to Canada 
Dutch legal scholars
Members of the Royal Netherlands Academy of Arts and Sciences
Scientists from Amsterdam
University of Amsterdam alumni
University of Toronto alumni
Academic staff of the Université de Montréal